Zamia erosa is a species of cycad native to the Caribbean islands of Jamaica, Cuba, and Puerto Rico, described by Orator Fuller Cook and Guy N. Collins in 1903. The species formerly known as Z. amblyphyllidia (described in 1987) was determined in 2010 to be the same species as Z. erosa. It is listed as vulnerable by the IUCN Red List.

References

erosa
Flora of Cuba
Flora of Jamaica
Flora of Puerto Rico